Maxence Perrin (born 1 April 1995) is a French actor, best known for his parts in Les Choristes (English title The Chorus), Petit homme and For intérieur.

He is the son of actor and film producer Jacques Perrin.

References

External links

Living people
1995 births
French male film actors
French male child actors